Gerhardt's Mill is a building of historical significance in the Battle of Stalingrad.  

Gerhardt's Mill is situated directly across from Pavlov's House in central (modern-day) Volgograd. It is preserved in its bombed-out state and is one of the main landmarks of the Battle of Stalingrad. The mill provided a vital role in the Defense of Stalingrad.

History 

The history of the mill began in 1899, when the Gerhardt family of entrepreneurs received permission to build a flour-grinding complex in what is now central Volgograd, overlooking the River Volga. The mill was put into operation, and flour sales began on 1 August 1900. The mill operated until a devastating fire in August 1907 destroyed the complex. A new building was built on the same site by May 1908. Despite being called a "mill", it served as a food processing complex, where in addition to the mill, there was also a smokery for fish, butter production facilities, a bakery, and warehouses for finished products. The technical equipment used the most advanced technologies of its time: it had its own generator, which gave independence from the city power grid, its own boiler room (from which the brick pipe has survived), internal mechanical conveyors (from which there are still broken remnants).

Battle of Stalingrad 

During the Battle of Stalingrad, Gerhardt's Mill became the final frontier, with the Soviet Red Army deterring the army of German Field Marshal Friedrich Paulus on the approaches to the Volga. Fierce fighting for the mill lasted for several months: it was bombed, and blown up numerous times, but the German Army failed to take it, or pass around it.

The building was semi-surrounded for 58 days, and during those days it sustained numerous hits from air bombs and shells. This damage can still be seen today. Every square meter of the exterior walls was cut by shells, bullets and shrapnel, and the reinforced concrete beams on the roof were broken by direct hits from aircraft bombs. Hundreds of cubic meters of very high-quality brickwork and reinforced concrete were blown out of the building. The sides of the building testify to the different intensities of mortar and artillery fire - minimal on the Volga side, on the other three sides traces of firing from all types of artillery can be seen, as well as loopholes in the window openings made by the defenders of the house. The increased strength and vibration resistance of the reinforced concrete frame, necessary for the operation of industrial equipment of the mill, helped the building to survive and not to be destroyed to the ground.

References

Battle of Stalingrad
Ruins in Russia
Monuments and memorials in Volgograd
Cultural heritage monuments of federal significance in Volgograd Oblast